The Kalamian languages are a small cluster of languages spoken in the Philippines: Calamian Tagbanwa and Agutaynen. Other languages called Tagbanwa, the Aborlan Tagbanwa language and Central Tagbanwa language are members of the Palawanic languages.

These are among the few languages of the Philippines which continue to be written in indigenous scripts, though mostly for poetry.

Classification

The Kalamian languages are a primary branch of the Philippine language family.

References

Himes, Ronald S. 2007. "The Kalamian microgroup of Philippine languages". Studies in Philippine languages and cultures 15:54-72.

Further reading
Zorc, R. David. 1972. Agutaynon notes.
Zorc, R. David. 1972. Kalamian notes.

See also
Tagbanwa script

 
Philippine languages
Languages of Palawan